Tyler Stephen Pill (born May 29, 1990) is an American former professional baseball pitcher and outfielder. He has played in Major League Baseball (MLB) for the New York Mets.

Career

Amateur
Pill was drafted by the Colorado Rockies in the 38th round of the 2008 MLB June Amateur Draft from Covina High School in Covina, California and the New York Mets in the 4th round of the 2011 MLB June Amateur Draft from California State University, Fullerton in Fullerton, California.

Pill is the younger brother of former professional first baseman Brett Pill, who also played college baseball for Cal State Fullerton.

Over three seasons with the Cal State Fullerton Titans, Pill pitched and played the outfield, had a 3.19 earned run average, 1.06 WHIP, 5.13 strikeout to walk ratio, .336 batting average, .421 on-base percentage and .488 slugging percentage. Collegiate Baseball, Baseball America and the National Collegiate Baseball Writers Association all named him to Freshman All-American teams after he set his school's freshman records in wins and shutouts. He and teammate Noe Ramirez were named co-Big West Conference Freshman Pitcher of the Year. Fullerton had a .724 winning percentage in Pill's time with the program and won the Big West Conference title twice in three seasons.

In 2010, he played collegiate summer baseball with the Harwich Mariners of the Cape Cod Baseball League.

New York Mets
On May 26, the Mets demoted Rafael Montero to the AAA Las Vegas 51s and promoted Pill to take his spot on the roster. He made his Major League debut in the tenth inning of the following night's game against the Pittsburgh Pirates at PNC Park, getting two outs but giving up a single, a hit batsman, and a walk and taking the loss. Pill made his first Major League start on May 30, 2017 against the Milwaukee Brewers at Citi Field. He allowed one run over 5.1 innings. On August 24, it was announced he would be shut down for the season after undergoing an arthroscopic debridement of his right elbow. He elected free agency on November 6, 2017.

Arizona Diamondbacks
On January 15, 2018, he was signed by the Arizona Diamondbacks to a minor league contract.

Los Angeles Dodgers
On April 21, 2018, he was traded to the Los Angeles Dodgers in exchange for cash considerations. The Dodgers assigned him to AAA Oklahoma City where he made 19 appearances (13 starts) and finished the season with a 3–5 record and 4.76 ERA. He elected free agency on November 2, 2018.

Texas Rangers
On February 19, 2019, Pill signed a minor league contract with the Texas Rangers as an outfielder. He was released on July 15, 2019. 

After being released by the Rangers organization, Pill retired and is currently a student at CSU Fullerton.

Personal life
Pill's brother is retired MLB player Brett Pill.

References

External links

1990 births
Living people
People from San Dimas, California
Baseball players from California
Baseball outfielders
Major League Baseball pitchers
New York Mets players
Cal State Fullerton Titans baseball players
Harwich Mariners players
Gulf Coast Mets players
Brooklyn Cyclones players
Savannah Sand Gnats players
Binghamton Mets players
St. Lucie Mets players
Las Vegas 51s players
Binghamton Rumble Ponies players
Reno Aces players
Oklahoma City Dodgers players
Tulsa Drillers players
Nashville Sounds players